Huancane Apacheta (possibly from Aymara wanqa a big stone, -ni a suffix, wanqani "the one with a stone (or stones)", apachita the place of transit of an important pass in the principal routes of the Andes; name in the Andes for a stone cairn built along the trail in the high mountains) is a mountain in the Vilcanota mountain range in the Andes of Peru, about  high. It is located in the Cusco Region, Canchis Province, Checacupe District, and in the Puno Region, Carabaya Province, Corani District. Huancane Apacheta lies between the mountain Otoroncane in the northeast and Tutallipina and Sayrecucho in the southwest.

Huancane is the name of the river which originates northeast of the mountain. Its waters flow to the Vilcanota River.

References 

Mountains of Cusco Region
Mountains of Puno Region
Mountains of Peru